Haplopappus glutinosus, known also by the common name sticky haplopappus is a species of plant in the genus Haplopappus in the family Asteraceae. It is native to Chile and Argentina.

Description
Haplopappus glutinosus is an evergreen perennial which forms a cushion. Its leaves are sticky, which is the basis for its species name (glutinosus is a cognate of 'glutinous').

In summer, it bears yellow daisy-like flowers which reach up to 2.5 centimeters in diameter.

Etymology
Haplopappus is derived from Greek and means 'single-down' or 'single feather'. The name is in reference to the single pappus attached to each seed.

Glutinosus means 'sticky', 'glutinous', 'viscous', or 'glue-bearing'.

References

Flora of Chile
Flora of Argentina
glutinosus